Mapleton Communications (MC) was a media company.  It was formed in May 2001 to acquire and operate radio stations in mid-sized markets in the western United States.  Mapleton owned and operated 41 radio stations (11 AM and 30 FM) in  California, Oregon and Washington State. It was based in Monterey, California.

History
Mapleton was founded in 2001 by Adam Nathanson, son of billionaire cable businessman Marc Nathanson. The Nathanson family roots in radio go back to advertising executive Don Paul Nathanson, who first published Radio Showmanship Magazine in 1940. DP Nathanson bought his first radio station in 1952 along with Burt Harris (KTWO) in Casper, Wyoming. D.P. Nathanson was the founder of Grey North Advertising and Vice-Chairman of Grey Advertising before his death in 1980.  Current CEO/President is Jim Shea, formerly with Clear Channel and others.

In July 2019, Mapleton announced its exit from the radio business, with four stations going to Bustos Media and the remaining stations going to Stephens Media Group. The sale to Stephens was approved on October 9, 2019,  and was completed on October 15, 2019, bringing a close to the nearly 20-year history of the company.

List of Former Mapleton Stations before selling to Stephens Media Group

                

Alexandria
 KLAA-FM 103.5 Country
 KEZP 104.3 Christian Adult Contemporary
 KBKK 105.5 Classic Country
 KEDG 106.9 Adult contemporary

Chico
 KALF New Country 95.7	

Medford
 KTMT 580 Sports
 KTMT-FM 93.7	Top-40
 KBOY-FM 95.7	Classic Rock
 KCMX 880 News/Talk
 KCMX-FM 101.9 Adult Contemporary
 KAKT HD1 105.1 NEW Country
KAKT HD2 95.1 CLASSIC Country 
				
Merced, California
 KUBB 96.3 Country
 KABX-FM 97.5 Adult Contemporary
 KLOQ-FM 98.7 Regional Mexican
 KHTN 104.7 Top 40
 KYOS 1480	News/Talk
 KBRE 1660	Active Rock

Monroe
 KMYY 92.3 Country
 KNNW 103.1 CHR/Top 40
 KXRR 106.1 Mainstream Rock
 KZRZ 98.3 Adult Contemporary
			
Monterey-Salinas-Santa Cruz, California
 KCDU 101.7 CHR/Top 40
 KPIG-FM 107.5 Americana
 KHIP 104.3 Classic Rock
 KKHK 95.5	Variety Adult Hits
 KWAV 96.9 Adult Contemporary

Redding, California
 KQMS News Talk 1670 / 104.9 / 105.7
 KSHA K-Shasta Adult Contemporary 104.3  
 KWLZ Wild 99-3 Rhythmic CHR 99.3 
 KRRX 106X Rock 106.1 / 104.9 Burney
 KNRO Fox Sports 1400 / 103.9
 KRDG Classic Hits 105.3 
												
Spokane
 KBBD 103.9 Adult Hits
 KDRK-FM 93.7 Country
 KEYF-FM 101.1 Classic Hits
 KGA 1510 Sports/Talk
 KJRB 790 Classic Rock
 KZBD 105.7 Top-40

Stations divested to Other Groups 
Chico
 KFMF Rock 93.9 / 100.5 Weaverville
 KQPT Now 107-5 CHR 107.5 /107.9
 KZAP Classic Hits 96.7 

San Francisco-Oakland-San Jose
 KSFN 1510 Chinese (Mandarin); licensed to Piedmont, California

References

Defunct radio broadcasting companies of the United States
2019 disestablishments in California
Mass media companies established in 2001
Mass media companies disestablished in 2019